The 2019 National Premier Leagues was the seventh season of the Australian National Premier Leagues football competition. The league competition was played by eight separate state and territory member federations. The divisions are ACT, NSW, Northern NSW, Queensland, South Australia, Tasmania, Victoria and Western Australia. The winners of each respective divisional league competed in a finals series tournament at season end, culminating in a Grand Final.

Wollongong Wolves were crowned National Premier Leagues Champions and originally qualified directly for the 2020 FFA Cup Round of 32. Since that competition was cancelled, Wollongong Wolves qualified for the 2021 FFA Cup Round of 32.

League tables

ACT

Finals

NSW

Finals

Northern NSW

Finals

Queensland

Finals

South Australia

Finals

Tasmania

Victoria

Finals

Western Australia

Finals

Final Series
The winner of each league competition (top of the table) in the NPL competed in a single match knockout tournament to decide the National Premier Leagues Champion for 2019. Home advantage for the semi-finals and final was based on a formula relating to time of winning (normal time, extra time or penalties), goals scored and allowed, and yellow/red cards. In addition, the winner will qualify for the 2020 FFA Cup Round of 32.

Quarter-finals

Semi-finals

Grand Final

Grand Final clubs' stadiums

References

External links
 Official website

2019
2019 domestic association football leagues
2019 in Australian soccer